Ultimatum were an influential hardcore punk band based in Melbourne, Australia, and formed in 1995. They were the first vegan straight edge band in Australia and appeared around the same time that Earth Crisis released Destroy the Machines. Ultimatum were one of the early Australian bands to introduce the modern 'new school' metal influenced form of hardcore to Australia. They were also recognised, not only for their vegan straight edge stance, but also for their emotional and politically charged lyrics.

In 1995 upon release of their demo, Ultimatum raised the interest and ire of people within the small punk and hardcore scene in Australia with their expressly militant lyrics and fanzine interviews.

In late 1996, after some line-up changes, Ultimatum rechartered their direction, taking a more personal and broader political focus in their lyrics. They garnered a following around Australia and in Europe with the release of their first self-titled EP in 1997, recorded by engineer Scott Harper and mastered by Martin Pullan.

Ultimatum's second split EP released on Melbourne based Trial and Error/Shock Records, with highly regarded and now defunct hardcore band Not for You was well received. This release promptly sold out and is now a rare item.

During their time, Ultimatum performed with international bands H2O, Strife, Vision of Disorder, Sommerset and Australian bands 28 Days, Mindsnare, Vicious Circle and many others.

Ultimatum disbanded in 2000. Members of the band have gone on to perform in other outfits in various music genres including Meatlocker (UK), Within Blood, Hitlist, AudioWoundStabber and The Stupid Questions.

Members
Lloyd Denovan - Guitar
Daniel Kukiel - Vocals
Emillie Reader - Bass
Tim Dywelska - Guitar
Adam Nanscawen - Drums

Former members
Michael Denovan - Drums
Billy Forde - Vocals

Discography

Demos and EPs
Demo (1995)
Ultimatum EP(1997) - Self Released, UP002
Split CD with Not for You (2000) - Shock Records, Trial and Error

Compilations
New Tools for the Hunter (1997) - First Blood Records
Mother Earth (1997) - Impression Recordings
Bastard Squad (1997) - Bastard Squad Fanzine
Underground Surf (1998) - Phantom Records, Mushroom Records, Underground Surf Magazine
Falsestart Vol. 1 (1998) - Falsestart Magazine
The Good Life (1999) - Good Life Records, Trial and Error
Punk You (2000) - Shock Records
True 'til Death Vol. 2 (2005) - Snapshot Records

External links
MySpace Page
MusicMight

Straight edge groups
Australian hardcore punk groups